Aguri Suzuki F-1 Super Driving, released as Redline F-1 Racer in North America, is a Formula One racing simulator game for the Super Nintendo Entertainment System and Game Boy. The game is named after and sponsored by the Japanese Formula 1 driver, Aguri Suzuki; his likeness and imagery were retained in the North American version despite the name change.

Summary

Everything from treacherous right turns to gasoline is simulated as the player tries to win the FIA World Drivers' and Constructors' Championships. The player can play a single race (non-championship Formula One race) or a season mode where the winner takes all, and the losers can wait until next year. This game is based on the 1992 Formula One season. The player's default role is a driver on the Footwork Racing team (Aguri Suzuki's old team), though they can choose to race with pastiches of five other teams, namely McLaren, Ferrari, Williams, Benetton and Jordan (the latter two uses their 1991 liveries).

Players are given the ability to customize their racing vehicle; transforming them into the pit crew in addition to the driver himself. Suspension, wings, and brakes among other things can be altered to gain lap times in addition to positions on the track. Winning is near impossible unless the player can successfully tinker with his vehicle from the beginning of the race week. Even the weather can betray the player; having the wrong tires will make the car skid out. Aguri Suzuki appears in the game as the most expert driver.

The graphics in the Super NES/Famicom version use mode 7 graphics similar to Super Mario Kart and F-Zero. In 1993, Aguri Suzuki F-1 Super Driving was released for the Game Boy handheld, exclusively in Japan. In this game, the player can control a kart and a Formula One car.

The PAL version of the game is considered to be quite rare.

Reception
Electronic Games scored the game 83%, with Arnie Katz calling it a "deep Formula One sim."

References

1992 video games
Absolute Entertainment games
Altron games
Formula One video games
Kart racing video games
Game Boy games
Genki (company) games
LOZC G. Amusements games
Super Nintendo Entertainment System games
Video games set in 1992
Multiplayer and single-player video games
Video games based on real people
Video games developed in Japan
Video games scored by Motoaki Takenouchi
Suzuki
Suzuki